The men's 4 × 100 metres relay competition of the athletics events at the 1979 Pan American Games took place at the Estadio Sixto Escobar. The defending Pan American Games champion was the United States team.

Records
Prior to this competition, the existing world and Pan American Games records were as follows:

Results

Final

Held on 14 July

References

Athletics at the 1979 Pan American Games
1979